Gerhard Hellwig (17 July 1925 – 15 January 2011) was a German conductor and choir director.

Career 
Hellwig was born in Berlin. After returning home from captivity, he founded the Schöneberger Sängerknaben on 12 November 1947. He was also deputy director of the Oper Frankfurt, managing director of the Berliner Festwochen and co-founder of the Berliner Theatertreffen.

He recorded numerous records with the Schöneberger Sängerknaben and undertook more than 300 concert tours at home and abroad. He performed at the White House and at the German-American Steuben Parade in New York City, among other places.

Hellwig directed his boys' choir for more than sixty years until 2010, when he put the choir's work on hold due to eye surgery that same year. At Christmas 2010, he fell in his apartment building on Budapest Street and suffered a fractured neck of the femur. On 15 January 2011, he died in Berlin at the age of 85.

Honours 
 Verdienstkreuz 1. Klasse der Bundesrepublik Deutschland
 1 October 1997: Order of Merit of Berlin

References

Further reading 
 Auf Wiedersehen, Schöneberger Sängerknaben Abschied von Gerhard Hellwig. In Berliner Morgenpost. 29 January 2011.
 Andreas Conrad: Komm mal her, kannst du singen? In Der Tagesspiegel. 17 January 2011.
 Oliver Ohmann: Sängerknaben: Der Chor, der einfach verschwunden ist. In Berliner Zeitung, 6 May 2011, retrieved 21 March 2021.

External links 
 
 

German conductors (music)
German choral conductors
Officers Crosses of the Order of Merit of the Federal Republic of Germany
Recipients of the Order of Merit of Berlin
1925 births
2011 deaths
Musicians from Berlin